Cleator  is a village in the English county of Cumbria and within the boundaries of the historic county of Cumberland.

Cleator is 1½ miles south of the town of Cleator Moor on the A5086 road. Cleator was the original village, Cleator Moor being the moor above the village. It is the site of the former Kangol hat factory. The factory buildings and shop are now closed. Cleator is located on the River Ehen, which is joined by the River Keekle at Longlands Lake.

On Thursday 19 November 2009, rainfall of over 300 mm was recorded in Cumbria. The surge of water off the fells of the Lake District flowed back to the Irish Sea down the rivers of West Cumbria, including the River Derwent which caused flooding and damage at Keswick, Cockermouth and Workington. The River Ehen burst its banks at Cleator, near to the Kangol factory, flooding fields and a number of residential properties.
 
Cleator was the site of a number of mills (originally linen). This was how Kangol came to be located at Cleator. Following the development of iron ore mining in nearby areas, Cleator was the site of associated works (hence the street name "Kiln Brow" and the location "The Forge"). Longlands Lake nature reserve is on the site of the former Longlands iron ore mine that first produced ore in 1879 from four pits. By 1924 the mines had been abandoned. In 1939 the mines started to subside and flood the area creating Longlands Lake. Longlands was acquired by Cumbria County Council in 1980.

St Mary's Catholic Church was designed by the architect E. W. Pugin (the son of the better known A.W.N. Pugin, whose works include the Houses of Parliament) and opened in 1872. It has a grotto, constructed to give work to the unemployed men of the parish during the depression of 1926, which mimics that of Lourdes and is the venue for an annual procession. Cleator lies on Alfred Wainwright's Coast to Coast Walk and is on the edge of the Lake District, with Dent Fell on the skyline to the south east. Cleator also boasts an Anglican church, St Leonard's, which dates to the 12th century.

Cleator Cricket Club, whose home is the picturesque J.D. Campbell Memorial Ground, field three teams, the 1st XI playing in the North Lancashire League. On 8 September 2013 the club achieved fame by winning the National Village Cup at Lord's Cricket Ground in London. They defeated the Gloucestershire team of Rockhampton by 1 wicket with 8 balls to spare in a tense and closely fought final.

Cleator forms part of the district of Copeland. Cleator is near the port town of Whitehaven.

See also

Listed buildings in Cleator Moor

References

External links 

 Cumbria County History Trust: Cleator (nb: provisional research only – see Talk page)

Cleator Moor Town Council
Some details of the parish church
Little Ireland website

Villages in Cumbria
Cleator Moor